The iPhone 14 Pro and iPhone 14 Pro Max are smartphones designed, developed, and marketed by Apple Inc. They are the sixteenth-generation flagship iPhones, succeeding the iPhone 13 Pro and iPhone 13 Pro Max. The devices were unveiled alongside the iPhone 14 and iPhone 14 Plus during the Apple Event at Apple Park in Cupertino, California on September 7, 2022.  Pre-orders for the iPhone 14 Pro and 14 Pro Max began on September 9, 2022, and were made available on September 16, 2022.

The iPhone 14 Pro and iPhone 14 Pro Max are the first iPhones to have a new type of display cutout called "Dynamic Island", replacing the notch design that has been in use since the iPhone X was introduced. Along with the iPhone 14, iPhone 14 Pro models add bidirectional satellite connectivity to contact emergency services when out of range of Wi-Fi and cellular networks.
iPhone 14 Pro and iPhone 14 Pro Max models (as well as the iPhone 14 and 14 Plus) sold in the United States dropped support for physical SIM cards, making them the first iPhone models since the CDMA variant of the iPhone 4 to lack a discrete SIM card reader.

History 
On November 6, 2022, COVID-19 affected product assembly in Chinese factories, resulting in longer shipment times for some customers.

Design 

The iPhone 14 Pro and iPhone 14 Pro Max are available in four colors: Silver, Space Black, Gold and Deep Purple. Deep Purple is a new color replacing Sierra Blue used on the iPhone 13 Pro and iPhone 13 Pro Max.

Specifications

Hardware

Chipset 
The iPhone 14 Pro and Pro Max feature a new A16 Bionic system on a chip (SoC), built on TSMC's N4 fabrication process, superseding the A15 Bionic seen on the iPhone 13 and 13 Pro lineup, the 3rd generation iPhone SE, and the iPhone 14 and 14 Plus.

Camera 
The camera sensors and lenses on the main and ultra-wide cameras have been upgraded. The main camera features a new 48-megapixel quad-pixel sensor that is 65% larger than the one on the iPhone 13 Pro. It defaults to 12 megapixels, achieved through a process called pixel binning. However, users can access the full capabilities of the sensor by activating the ProRAW feature. The ultra-wide camera features a new larger 12-megapixel sensor that has 100% focus pixels. The lens has also been improved for optical clarity and features a larger aperture.

The new camera system also incorporates a new "Photonic Engine" for improved image and video quality. Additionally, the video feature now includes Action Mode, which offers video stabilization that can be accessed through the top right corner of the screen. The resolution of the picture can now be customized.   
The TrueDepth camera has gained autofocus and a larger aperture. It is also capable of focusing on multiple subjects simultaneously.

Display 
The iPhone 14 Pro and Pro Max feature a Super Retina XDR OLED display with a typical maximum brightness of 1,000 nits. However, it can go all the way up to 1,600 nits while watching HDR videos, and 2,000 nits outdoors. The display has a refresh rate of 120 Hz and utilizes LTPO technology. The iPhone 14 Pro has a resolution of 2556×1179 pixels at 460 pixels per inch (ppi), while the Pro Max variant has a resolution of 2796×1290 pixels at 460 ppi. Both variants have an "always on display" feature, with an adaptive ProMotion 120 Hz refresh rate that can reduce down to 1 Hz to save battery life whilst in “always on” mode.

Both models feature a new design for the area that surrounds the front-facing camera, which Apple previously referred to as the "TrueDepth camera array" and many users referred to as the "notch". The new design is called the "Dynamic Island", which is now a pill-shaped cutout slightly detached from the top of the screen. In order to make this new hardware blend more seamlessly with the software, software features are added to make the pill shape change shape and size according to app and features being used to display certain alerts and notifications.

Battery 
The iPhone 14 Pro has a 3200 mAh battery that provides 23 hours of video playback and 20 hours of streaming video playback. The Pro Max variant has a 4323 mAh battery that provides 29 hours of video playback and 25 hours of streaming video playback.

Connectivity 
In addition to all the connectivity options offered on previous models, the iPhone 14 Pro and Pro Max can now utilize satellite connectivity to make calls or send texts in an emergency. The feature is marketed as "Emergency SOS". It uses the spectrum in L and S bands designated for mobile satellite services by ITU Radio Regulations. When an iPhone user makes an Emergency SOS via satellite request, the message is received by an orbiting satellite operated by Globalstar. The satellite then sends the message down to ground stations located across the globe.

As of November 2022, Globalstar operates a constellation of 24 satellites in low-earth orbit, with plans to enhance this in the future via its partnership with Apple.

The service became available to the public on November 15, 2022. On the same day, Apple announced that it will be extended to France, Germany, Ireland, and the UK in December 2022.

Software 

Like the iPhone 14 and 14 Plus, the iPhone 14 Pro and Pro Max have iOS 16 installed.

Detailed specs

References

External links 
  – official website

IOS

Mobile phones introduced in 2022
Mobile phones with 4K video recording
Mobile phones with multiple rear cameras
Flagship smartphones